Some Time in New York City is a part-studio, part-live double album by John Lennon and Yoko Ono as Plastic Ono Band that included backing by the American rock band Elephant's Memory. Released in June 1972 in the US and in September 1972 in the UK on Apple Records, it is the third album to bear Lennon's name since he left the Beatles, and his fourth with Ono. Like Lennon's previous solo albums, it was co-produced by Lennon, Ono and Phil Spector. The album's agitprop lyrics are politically charged compared to its predecessors, addressing political and social issues and topics such as sexism, incarceration, colonialism, and racism.

Recording for the album's studio portion took place between December 1971 and March 1972 while the live portion, released as Live Jam, was recorded on 15 December 1969 at the Lyceum Ballroom in London for a UNICEF charity concert and on 6 June 1971 at Fillmore East in New York City. Musicians who contributed to the 1969 performance included Eric Clapton, George Harrison, Nicky Hopkins, Keith Moon and Klaus Voormann, while the 1971 performance featured Frank Zappa and his band the Mothers of Invention.

Preceded by the single "Woman Is the Nigger of the World", which caused controversy due to its title, Some Time in New York City received scathing reviews on release and performed poorly commercially. Reviewers were especially critical of its politically charged content. Zappa was critical of Lennon and Ono's handling of the recordings of the Mothers performance, eventually releasing his own version of the performance on Playground Psychotics (1992). Some Time in New York City was reissued on compact disc in 2005 as a single album, removing several of the Live Jam songs while adding other non-album singles, and again on CD in 2010 in its original double album format.

Background
John Lennon and Yoko Ono moved to New York City in September 1971 and continued their involvement in political, peace and social justice causes of the counterculture era. When they settled in Greenwich Village, in October, they were quickly contacted by activists Jerry Rubin and Abbie Hoffman who persuaded them to appear at an upcoming rally for left-wing writer John Sinclair, who had been jailed for possession of two marijuana joints. The Lennons also spoke out on the Attica Prison riots, jailing of Angela Davis and oppression of women. On 12 November, Lennon and Ono taped numerous demos of "The Luck of the Irish", which were videotaped by director John Reilly for a 17-minute documentary short titled Luck of the Irish – A Videotape by John Reilly. On 9 December, Lennon and Ono flew to Ann Arbor, Michigan, for the John Sinclair rally, which was due to start the next day. Soon after their arrival, Lennon recorded "Chords of Fame" with Phil Ochs. At the rally itself, Lennon and Ono played four songs that would end up on Some Time in New York City: "Attica State", "The Luck of the Irish", "Sisters O Sisters" and "John Sinclair". The performance was filmed, and included in the short film Ten for Two which was shown locally in Ann Arbor sometime in December.

Lennon and Ono, along with David Peel, performed Peel's "The Ballad of New York" on The David Frost Show, with Lennon playing tea-chest bass. The trio, now joined by The Lower East Side Band, played the same set of songs that Lennon and Ono had played at the John Sinclair rally, though the version of "The Luck of the Irish" was shorter. This episode was recorded on 16 December 1971 and broadcast on 13 January 1972. The next day, Lennon and Ono performed at a benefit concert for families of victims of the Attica Prison riot at the Apollo Theater, playing acoustic versions of "Imagine", "Attica State", and "Sisters, O Sisters".

Recording
The original double album contained the live album Live Jam, featuring the Plastic Ono Supergroup's 15 December 1969 live performances of "Cold Turkey" and "Don't Worry Kyoko (Mummy's Only Looking for Her Hand in the Snow)" at the Lyceum Ballroom in London, for a UNICEF charity show billed as the "Peace for Christmas Concert". In addition to Lennon and Ono, the supergroup featured George Harrison, The Who's drummer Keith Moon, Delaney & Bonnie, Billy Preston and Legs Larry Smith, among others. Harrison, who had been touring with Delaney & Bonnie, received a phone call from Lennon and was excited about the prospect of performing with him. The ballroom had its interior covered by posters declaring "WAR IS OVER, if you want it, love John and Yoko." For "Cold Turkey", Ono sat inside a white bag located near Lennon's feet, later jumping out of the bag during "Don't Worry Kyoko (Mummy's Only Looking for Her Hand in the Snow)", facing the crowd and screaming at them. Toward the end of the latter performance, Ono broke down crying. An early mix of the two tracks was produced by the Abbey Road Studios engineers on 26 November 1970 and was sent to Lennon and Ono. The album also featured a recording of Lennon and Ono performing with Frank Zappa and The Mothers of Invention at the Fillmore East on 6 June 1971, a collaboration instigated by Andy Warhol. Ono arranged for the performance to be filmed, and Klaus Voormann overdubbed some of his bass parts at a later date.

Throughout January, until the 21st, Lennon mixed the live album at the Record Plant. Lennon also mixed the recordings of the John Sinclair rally, as well as the Apollo Theatre and Lyceum Ballroom performances, for possible release as EPs; however, only the Lyceum performance was released. Lennon and Ono, with the assistance of studio drummer Jim Keltner, hired Elephant's Memory, a local band known for their hard partying and anti-establishment musical style, to back them for a series of albums and live performances. Lennon once again brought in Phil Spector to co-produce the new studio album, which was completed on 20 March 1972. Around this time, Lennon and Ono were producing Elephant's Memory's self-titled album. Several jams were recorded, featuring Lennon and Elephant's Memory, all of which remained unreleased: "Don't Be Cruel", "Hound Dog", "Send Me Some Lovin'", "Roll Over Beethoven", "Whole Lotta Shakin' Goin' On", "It'll Be Me", "Not Fade Away", "Ain't That a Shame" and "Caribbean".

Music and lyrics
The opening song of the studio album, "Woman Is the Nigger of the World" (a phrase Ono had coined in the late 1960s), was intended as a negation of sexism and was also issued as a single in the US to controversial reaction, and – as a consequence – little airplay. The Lennons went to great lengths (including a press conference attended by staff from Jet and Ebony magazines) to explain that the word "nigger" was not meant as an affront to black people. A quote from Ron Dellums, referring to the use of the word "nigger", appeared in an issue of Billboard (referred to on an episode of The Dick Cavett Show). Lennon's other tracks include the biographical "New York City", a Chuck Berry-styled rocker that details the Lennons' early months in their new home, as well as "John Sinclair", his musical plea for Sinclair's release from a ten-year sentence for giving two marijuana joints to an undercover policewoman.

Ono, a feminist, responds musically with "Sisters, O Sisters", tackles the lacking education system with "Born in a Prison", and celebrates a culture of one in "We're All Water". Together, Lennon and Ono lament police brutality in "Attica State", the hardships of war-torn Northern Ireland in "Sunday Bloody Sunday" and "The Luck of the Irish" (see Bloody Sunday (1972) article), and pay tribute to Angela Davis with "Angela".

Release
Some Time in New York City was issued in the US on 12 June 1972 but delayed until 15 September in the UK, due to a dispute with Northern Songs over publishing rights on songs co-written by Lennon and Ono. The album was packaged like a newspaper (an approach previously employed on The Four Seasons' The Genuine Imitation Life Gazette, Jefferson Airplane's Volunteers and Jethro Tull's Thick as a Brick), depicting the events covered in the album's songs, causing even more consternation with an image of Richard Nixon and Mao Zedong dancing nude together. (The photo was stickered over on many of the issued copies, with a non-removable seal.)

With most of the gatefold cover space taken up by printed lyrics and photographs, the album credits appeared on the first disc's inner sleeve. The customised label, featuring the face of Lennon morphing into Ono's, was created by Iain Macmillan. The inner sleeve for Live Jam featured Lennon's doodling over the cover of Zappa's album, Fillmore East - June 1971, adding his credits and commentary to Zappa's.

Initial copies of the US edition included a photograph of the Statue of Liberty and a mailable petition to allow citizenship for John and Yoko. Also, the message "John and Yoko forever Peace on earth and goodwill to all men '72" is inscribed in the dead wax on Side 1.

Although the UK release managed a number 11 chart peak, it only went to number 48 in the US. Lennon was reportedly stunned by the album's failure and consequently did not record new music for almost a year.

Critical reception

On release, Some Time in New York City provided a startling contrast for listeners expecting a repeat of the well-received Imagine in 1971. According to author Robert Rodriguez, the new album received "abysmal reviews". In a scathing critique published in Rolling Stone, Stephen Holden wrote that "the Lennons should be commended for their daring", but not before calling the album "incipient artistic suicide". Holden added: "except for 'John Sinclair' the songs are awful. The tunes are shallow and derivative and the words little more than sloppy nursery-rhymes that patronise the issues and individuals they seek to exalt. Only a monomaniacal smugness could allow the Lennons to think that this witless doggerel wouldn't insult the intelligence and feelings of any audience."

Dave Marsh wrote a mixed review for Creem, stating that "it's not half bad. It may be 49.9% bad, but not half." The Milwaukee Sentinel declared that John and Yoko had produced "another crude, superficial look at trendy leftist politics and have plunged even further into their endless echo chamber". In the NME, Tony Tyler presented his album review in the form of an open letter, titled "Lennon, you're a pathetic, ageing revolutionary". After criticising Lennon for "the general tastelessness of the presentation", particularly the album's lyrics and cover art, Tyler concluded: "Don't rely on cant and rigidity. Don't alienate. Stimulate. You know, like you used to."

More recently, Garry Mulholland of Uncut magazine has described Some Time in New York City as "a contender for the worst LP by a major musical figure, its list of '70s left-wing clichés hamstrung by the utter absence of conviction within the melodies and lyrics". Writing in the Boston Phoenix in 2005, Eliot Wilder said that listening to the album was "a painful experience". Although he conceded that Lennon "had his heart in the right place", Wilder opined: "these tracks – pedantic, topical, elitist – show that a latter-day Dylan he was not ... Refer to the Beatles' 'Revolution' or his own 'Give Peace a Chance' if you need a dose of John the Protest Singer." More impressed, Mark Kemp of Paste considered that "the album has been unfairly chastised", identifying "Woman Is the Nigger of the World" as "one of Lennon's finest songs" and Ono's "Born in a Prison" as another highlight.

Legacy
On 30 August 1972, Lennon and Ono performed two benefit concerts for the Willowbrook State School for the mentally challenged at Madison Square Garden, at friend Geraldo Rivera's request. The shows, known as One to One, were filmed and recorded, with the evening show broadcast on ABC Television, and the earlier matinée show compiled for release as the 1986 live album and video, Live in New York City. New York mayor John Lindsay declared the date "One to One Day", and the performances proved to be Lennon's last full live concerts.

Zappa criticised the presentation of the Mothers' performance on Some Time in New York City, as the vocals of Mark Volman and Howard Kaylan had been removed, and Zappa did not receive writing credit for "King Kong", which was wrongly identified on this release as "Jamrag". He and Lennon had also agreed that each would release their own version of the performance, but Zappa was legally prevented from issuing his version, which did not appear until the release of Playground Psychotics in 1992.

After Lennon's death, the album, along with seven other Lennon albums, was reissued by EMI as part of a box set, released in the UK on 15 June 1981. Some Time in New York City was remixed, remastered and reissued in November 2005 as a single CD, removing, in the process, several of the Live Jam cuts, while adding "Happy Xmas (War Is Over)" and "Listen, the Snow Is Falling". On this remastered release, "John Sinclair" and "Attica State" were not remixed. In 2010, the album was digitally remastered and reissued on CD in its original double album format. Another remix (part of the "ultimate mix" campaign following the Imagine, Plastic Ono Band, and Gimme Some Truth albums) was slated for 2022.

Track listing
All songs written by John Lennon and Yoko Ono, except where noted. 

+ Originally written by Frank Zappa, titled "King Kong". However John Lennon and Yoko Ono claimed copyright, giving "King Kong" the new title "Jam Rag" (British slang for tampon).

Side one
"Woman Is the Nigger of the World" – 5:15
"Sisters, O Sisters" (Ono) – 3:46
"Attica State" – 2:54
"Born in a Prison" (Ono) – 4:03
"New York City" (Lennon) – 4:30

Side two
"Sunday Bloody Sunday" – 5:00
"The Luck of the Irish" – 2:56
"John Sinclair" (Lennon) – 3:28
"Angela" – 4:06
"We're All Water" (Ono) – 7:11

Side three
Performed live on 15 December 1969 at the Lyceum Ballroom in London, England for a UNICEF charity concert with George Harrison
"Cold Turkey" (Lennon) – 8:35
"Don't Worry Kyoko" (Ono) – 16:01

Side four
Recorded live on 6 June 1971 at the Fillmore East in New York City with Frank Zappa and The Mothers of Invention
"Well (Baby Please Don't Go)" (Walter Ward) – 4:41
"Jamrag" +  – 5:36
"Scumbag" (Lennon, Ono, Frank Zappa) – 4:27
"Aü" – 8:04

Alternate version of Side 4
Frank Zappa's version of the live recordings captured on side four of Some Time in New York City was released in 1992 on Frank Zappa's album Playground Psychotics. These mixes/edits make Zappa and his band more prominent in the mix, most notably in the song "Scumbag" where Mark Volman and Howard Kaylan's vocals are audible, which it had not been on Some Time in New York City. In some cases the songs were given new titles: "Say Please" and "Aaawk" are edited from "Jamrag" (a longer piece on Some Time in New York City), and "Aü" is retitled "A Small Eternity With Yoko Ono". The songs, which appear as tracks 22 through 26 on disc one of the CD, are denoted as follows:

2005 CD reissue
This remixed/remastered edition, issued on a single disc, omits much of the live material with Zappa (though it is available in a different mix/edit on Zappa's Playground Psychotics) and includes two bonus tracks. Some of the track times, notably for "We're All Water" and "Don't Worry Kyoko", differ from those on the original vinyl LPs.

"Woman Is the Nigger of the World" (Lennon, Ono) – 5:17
"Sisters, O Sisters" (Ono) – 3:48
"Attica State" (Lennon, Ono) – 2:55
"Born in a Prison" (Ono) – 4:05
"New York City" (Lennon) – 4:29
"Sunday Bloody Sunday" (Lennon, Ono) – 5:03
"The Luck of the Irish" (Lennon, Ono) – 2:59
"John Sinclair" (Lennon) – 3:30
"Angela" (Lennon, Ono) – 4:08
"We're All Water" (Ono) – 5:19
"Cold Turkey" (Live Jam) (Lennon) – 8:35
"Don't Worry Kyoko" (Live Jam) (Ono) – 15:20
"Well (Baby Please Don't Go)" (Live Jam) (Ward) – 4:33

Bonus tracks
 "Listen, the Snow Is Falling" (Ono) – 3:06
"Happy Xmas (War Is Over)" (Lennon, Ono) – 3:34

Personnel

Studio album
John Lennon – guitars, vocals
Yoko Ono – vocals
Jim Keltner – drums, percussion
Elephant's Memory:
Stan Bronstein – saxophone, flute
Wayne 'Tex' Gabriel – guitar
Richard Frank Jr. – drums, percussion
Adam Ippolito – piano, organ
Gary Van Scyoc – bass guitar
John La Bosca – piano

Live Jam
All credits taken from Lennon's handwritten credits on the Live Jam inner sleeve.

15 December 1969
John Lennon – guitar, vocals
Yoko Ono – bag, vocals

For everyone except himself and Ono, Lennon made up pseudonyms:

Eric Clapton ('Derek Claptoe') – guitar
Delaney & Bonnie ('Bilanie & Donnie') – guitar, percussion (and friends, brass, percussion)
Jim Gordon ('Jim Bordom') – drums
George Harrison ('George Harrisong') – guitar
Nicky Hopkins ('Sticky Topkins') – electric piano (overdubbed in N.Y. as organ was lost)
Bobby Keys ('Robbie Knees') – saxophone
Keith Moon ('Kief Spoon') – drums
Billy Preston ('Billy Presstud') – organ
Klaus Voormann ('Raus Doorman') – bass 
Alan White ('Dallas White') – drums

The audience in attendance is credited on the label as "a cast of 1000's" and on the dust jacket as a "star-studded cast of thousands!!"

Uncredited
Jim Price – trumpet

6 June 1971
John Lennon – guitar, vocals
Yoko Ono – bag, vocals
Aynsley Dunbar – drums
Bob Harris – keyboards, vocals
Howard Kaylan – vocals
Jim Pons – bass guitar, vocals
Don Preston – Mini-Moog
Ian Underwood – keyboard, vocals, woodwinds
Mark Volman – vocals
Klaus Voormann – bass guitar, vocals
Frank Zappa – guitar, vocals

Charts

References
 Footnotes

 Citations

External links

John Lennon albums
Yoko Ono albums
1972 albums
Live at the Fillmore East albums
Apple Records albums
Albums produced by Phil Spector
Plastic Ono Band albums
1972 live albums
Apple Records live albums
EMI Records albums
EMI Records live albums
Albums produced by John Lennon
Albums produced by Yoko Ono
Political music albums by English artists